The 1981 Women's Hockey World Cup was the fourth edition of the Women's Hockey World Cup, a field hockey tournament. It was held from the 27 March to 5 April 1981 at the CeNARD in Buenos Aires, Argentina.

West Germany won the tournament for a second time, defeating the Netherlands 3–1 in penalties after the final finished as a 1–1 draw. The Soviet Union finished in third place after defeating Australia 5–1.

Teams
Including the host nation, Argentina, 12 teams participated in the tournament:

Results

Preliminary round

Pool A

Pool B

Classification round

Ninth to twelfth place classification

Crossover

Eleventh and twelfth place

Ninth and tenth place

Fifth to eighth place classification

Crossover

Seventh and eighth place

Fifth and sixth place

First to fourth place classification

Crossover

Third and fourth place

Final

Medallists
The following are the squads of the three medalling nations, as well as fourth placed Australia:

Statistics

Final standings

References

External links
FIH official page
Results page

Women's Hockey World Cup
International women's field hockey competitions hosted by Argentina
International sports competitions in Buenos Aires
World Cup
World Cup
1980s in Buenos Aires
World Cup